Ana Ivanovic was the defending champion, but decided not to participate.

Petra Kvitová won the tournament, defeating Dominika Cibulková in the final 6–4, 6–1.

Seeds

Main draw

Finals

Top half

Bottom half

Qualifying

Seeds

Qualifiers

Lucky losers

Draw

First qualifier

Second qualifier

Third qualifier

Fourth qualifier

References
 Main Draw
 Qualifying Draw

Generali Ladies Linz - Singles